The Hundred of Allenby is a Hundred in the county of  Chandos County in South Australia.
  
The hundred was originally gazetted as the Hundred of Von Doussa in 1907, but the name was changed  due to the First World War and the hundred's present designation is for Edmund Allenby, 1st Viscount Allenby.

The traditional custodians of the area are the Ngargad people.

The railway arrived in the area in 1906.

References

Allenby